Giberson is a surname. Notable people with the surname include:

 Karl W. Giberson (born 1957), American physicist, scholar, and author
 Lydia Giberson (1899–1994), Canadian-American psychiatrist

See also
 Gilbertson

Patronymic surnames